Vries is a village in the Dutch province of Drenthe. It is a part of the municipality of Tynaarlo, and lies about 8 km north of Assen.

Vries was a separate municipality until 1998, when it was merged with Eelde and Zuidlaren into a new municipality called Tynaarlo.

History 
The village was first mentioned in 1139 as Vrees. The etymology is unclear. Vries is an esdorp which developed in the Early Middle Ages. The old village structure is still visible.

The Dutch Reformed church dates from the 12th century. It was extended around 1425. The church contains two sarcophagi.

Vries was home to 415 people in 1840. Vries used to be independent municipality. In 1998, it was merged into Tynaarlo.

Gallery

References

External links
Website of the Historical Association of Vries (in Dutch)

Municipalities of the Netherlands disestablished in 1998
Populated places in Drenthe
Former municipalities of Drenthe
Tynaarlo